John Pyne (died 1679) was English Member of Parliament for Poole in 1625–1629 and 1640–1653.

John Pyne may also refer to:
John Pyne (Lyme Regis MP), English Member of Parliament for Lyme Regis in 1529
John Pyne, Irish 'victim' of the alleged witch Florence Newton in 1660
John Pyne, dirt bike racer in the Australian Super Sedan Championship

See also
John Pine, English designer, engraver, and cartographer